The 2001 Segunda División Peruana, the second division of Peruvian football (soccer), was played by 16 teams. The tournament winner, Alcides Vigo was promoted to the Playoff. The last places, Aurora Chancayllo and Hijos de Yurimaguas were relegated. The tournament was played on a home-and-away round-robin basis.
 Sporting Cristal B can´t be promoted as they are the "reserve team" of Sporting Cristal which plays in First Division.

Results

Standings

Promotion playoff

Notes

External links
 RSSSF

Peruvian Segunda División seasons
Peru2
2001 in Peruvian football